Frozen is an album by the Finnish metal band Sentenced, released on 15 July 1998 via Century Media.

Track listing

Limited edition 
 "The Suicider"
 "Dead Leaves"
 "For the Love I Bear"
 "Creep" (Radiohead cover)
 "Digging the Grave" (Faith No More cover)
 "Kaamos"
 "Farewell"
 "One with Misery"
 "Grave Sweet Grave"
 "Burn"
 "Drown Together"
 "Let Go (The Last Chapter)"
 "The Rain Comes Falling Down"
 "Mourn"
 "I Wanna Be Somebody" (W.A.S.P. cover)
 "House of the Rising Sun" (The Animals cover)

Personnel 
 Ville Laihiala – vocals
 Miika Tenkula – guitar
 Sami Lopakka – guitar
 Sami Kukkohovi – bass
 Vesa Ranta – drums

Guest musician
 Birgit Zacher – backing vocals

References 

Sentenced albums
1998 albums
Century Media Records albums
Albums produced by Waldemar Sorychta

it:Frozen#Musica